New York State Electric and Gas (NYSEG) is an electric and gas utility company owned by Avangrid that serves customers in New York. NYSEG was incorporated in 1852 as the Ithaca Gas Light Company. Throughout the end of the 19th century and the early part of the 20th century, the corporation went through mergers and acquisitions that combined about 200 utility companies under the name NYSEG. In 1975 the corporation became an 18% partner in the Niagara Mohawk Power Corporation’s Nine Mile Point nuclear plant, and in the 1980s NYSEG completed a series of hydroelectric power plants. In 2008 NYSEG became part of Iberdrola, when Iberdrola bought Energy East.

See also
 New York State Public Service Commission

References

External links
 

Electric power companies of the United States
1852 establishments in New York (state)